The Great County Adit, sometimes called the County Adit, or the Great Adit was a system of interconnected adits that helped drain water from the tin and copper mines in the Gwennap area of Cornwall, in the United Kingdom.

The adit was the brainchild of John Williams (born 1714) of Scorrier who was the manager of Poldice mine. Although work was started in 1748, it did not reach Poldice mine until the late 1760s. By 1778 the adit had been extended past Wheal Busy to Wheal Peevor, and another branch, known as the Consols Adit was driven west in the 1770s and 80s to drain the Consolidated Mines and United Mines. By 1792 a branch from Poldice extended to Wheal Unity.

The portal of the adit is in the Carnon Valley below the hamlet of Twelveheads. In 1839, probably at its peak, it discharged over 14.5 million gallons (66 million litres) of water per day into the Carnon River. At that time the adit had more steam engines pumping into it than were used by the whole of continental Europe and America combined.

The Carnon River empties into Restronguet Creek (a tidal arm of the Carrick Roads upstream from Falmouth). Major floods in the winter of 1876 caused large quantities of gangue and silt to be washed into the higher part of Restronguet Creek, permanently damaging navigational access to the upper quays at Devoran.

Although all the mines served by the Great County Adit have closed and it is unmaintained, it still drains many of their underground workings today; in the summer of 1980 the flow was 500,000 gallons per day.

See also

Mining in Cornwall

References

Sources

History of Cornwall
Mining in Cornwall
History of mining in the United Kingdom
Tin mines in England
Industrial archaeological sites in Cornwall